Lycus Sulci is a feature in the Amazonis quadrangle on Mars, with its location centered at 24.6° north latitude and 141.1° west longitude.  It is 1,350 km long and is named after a classical albedo feature name.  The term "sulci" is applied to subparallel furrows and ridges.

Gallery

References 

Amazonis quadrangle
Ridges on Mars